Natasha Henry-Dixon is a Canadian historian, educator and academic known for work related to Black history in Ontario. She is a faculty member in the Department of History at York University and has served as the President of the Ontario Black History Society since 2017.

Education
Henry-Dixon obtained a B.A., B.Ed. and M.Ed. from York University continuing on at the school to complete her doctoral studies. Her doctoral work was supervised by Michele Johnson.

Career
Henry-Dixon began working with the Peel District School Board in 2014 as occasional elementary teacher. She became President of the Ontario Black History Society in 2017.

Henry-Dixon has written and created numerous education resources related to Black history in Ontario and Canada, including articles for The Canadian Encyclopedia related to the topic. In 2022 she authored Change Starts Now: Our Stories. Our History, summarizing archival research related to Black history in Guelph, Ontario. Henry-Dixon drew on her PhD dissertation project - "One Too Many: The Enslavement of Africans in Early Ontario, 1760 - 1834" - to create an online resource about slavery in Ontario. The work draws on research into the history of enslaved people in Upper Canada drawn from the review of government records, church registers, newspapers and other historical documents.

In 2022, Henry-Dixon joined the Department of History at York University as a tenure-stream faculty member with a focus on African Canadian History.

Awards
Henry-Dixon received the 2017 Curriculum Development Award from the Elementary Teachers' Federation of Ontario in recognition of classroom resources she created for Black History Month. In 2018 she was awarded a Vanier Canada Graduate Scholarship.

Publications

References

Academic staff of York University
York University alumni
Living people
Canadian historians
Canadian women historians